The following is a list of holidays in Zimbabwe:

Table

See also
Public holidays in Rhodesia, for historical holidays

References

Further reading
 Public Holidays 2017
 Public Holidays 2016

 
Zimbabwean culture
Events in Zimbabwe
Zimbabwe